John Zeleznik is an artist and illustrator.

Career
Zeleznik has provided covers and illustrative work for many role-playing games including Shadowrun, Rifts (and other Palladium Books games), and GURPS. He graduated from the Otis/Parsons Institute of Art in Los Angeles with a BFA in Illustration. He works in acrylic paint on illustration board.

He illustrated the covers to several Shadowrun books, including DNA/DOA (1990), Queen Euphoria (1990), and Bottled Demon (1990).

Zeleznik is also the designer and artist for the science fiction/superhero Skraypers setting for Rifts and Heroes Unlimited.

Some of his RPG credits include Beyond the Supernatural, Systems Failure, Nightbane, and Macross II.

Zeleznik has illustrated cards for the Magic: The Gathering collectible card game.

Lightstrike: The Collected Illustrations of John Zeleznik was published by Cartouche Press, and he also illustrated a Rifts Coloring Book.

Zeleznik also designed all of the labels for the Leona Valley Winery.

He contributed illustrations to the 2007 Hollywood Zombies trading card series.

References

External links
Official website

Lightstrike: The Art of John Zeleznik

American illustrators
Fantasy artists
Living people
Role-playing game artists
Role-playing game designers
Year of birth missing (living people)